Noose of Gold is a Kenyan television soap opera that premiered on NTV in 2010. It is created, directed and produced by Benjamin Odiwuor in conjunction with Maxpot Media. It is topbilled by an ensemble cast that has: Ainea Ojiambo, Nana Gichuru, Naomi Ng'ang'a, Serah Ndanu, Damaris Matunda and a supporting cast. It ran for three seasons from 2010 to 2013.

Cast

Regular cast 
Ainea Ojiambo as Ole Mpisha
Mumbi Lukwihili as Laboso
Serah Ndanu as Soila
Naomi Ng'ang'a as Madeline
Damaris Matunda as Tmaq
Nana Gichuru as Felma
Abel Amuga as Theo
Raymond Ofula as Shibi
Wanja Mworia as Telka
Nobert Ouma as Jawabu
Avril as Corrine
Godfrey Odhiambo
Ken Ambani as Mr. Temu
Martin Githinji
Damaris Matunda
Brenda Mwai
Grace Dola
Janet Sision

Supporting cast
Kirk Foda as Oraro
Mary Goiche as Lawyer
Joseph Kinyua as Doc
Kirumburu Ng'ng'a as Kirira
Godfrey Waiharo as Lemayan

Broadcast 
Noose of Gold' debuted in Kenya in 2010 on NTV network. It was broadcast for 3 seasons on the primetime 8:20pm timeslot. It aired across Africa in the Africa Magic Channel. In Uganda, it aired on NTV Uganda.

References 

Kenyan television soap operas
English-language television shows
2010s Kenyan television series
2010 Kenyan television series debuts
NTV (Kenyan TV channel) original programming